Samuel Soden (20 May 1925 – 29 August 1991), known as Sam Fonteyn, was an English composer and pianist, whose most significant output was for the Boosey & Hawkes Music Library, for which he composed and recorded many works.

Most are short character pieces for the piano with colourful titles indicating the images the pieces are meant to conjure. Others are bright orchestral pieces. Fonteyn's work has been heard on television since he recorded for Boosey & Hawkes in the 1970s. A music library recording was used as the theme of the British sitcom Please Sir! in 1968, and "Pop Looks Bach," recorded in 1970, was later used as the theme of the long-running television programme Ski Sunday. He also composed the piano music heard at the beginning of 'The Colour Purple', (which he also performed on the soundtrack) and a theme tune used for The Russian News.

His work was also featured on SpongeBob SquarePants, The Ren & Stimpy Show, Nirvanna the Band the Show, and Family Guy (a vaudeville duo use Fonteyn's "Galloping Gertie" as a vamp in a recurring gag).

Soden was born in Birmingham and died in Islington, London.

Audio samples

References

External links

1925 births
1991 deaths
Musicians from Birmingham, West Midlands
Vaudeville
Ragtime composers
English television composers
English classical composers
English classical pianists
20th-century classical pianists
20th-century English composers